Blakely Township may refer to one of the following places in the United States:

 Blakely Township, Geary County, Kansas
 Blakely Township, Gage County, Nebraska

See also
 Blakeley Township, Scott County, Minnesota